The Common European Framework of Reference for Languages: Learning, Teaching, Assessment, abbreviated in English as CEFR or CEF or CEFRL, is a guideline used to describe achievements of learners of foreign languages across Europe and, increasingly, in other countries. The CEFR is also intended to make it easier for educational institutions and employers to evaluate the language qualifications of candidates for education admission or employment. Its main aim is to provide a method of learning, teaching, and assessing that applies to all languages in Europe.

It was put together by the Council of Europe as the main part of the project "Language Learning for European Citizenship" between 1989 and 1996. In November 2001, a European Union Council Resolution recommended using the CEFR to set up systems of validation of language ability. The six reference levels (A1, A2, B1, B2, C1, C2) are becoming widely accepted as the European standard for grading an individual's language proficiency.

Development

An intergovernmental symposium in 1991 titled "Transparency and Coherence in Language Learning in Europe: Objectives, Evaluation, Certification" held by the Swiss Federal Authorities in the Swiss municipality of Rüschlikon found the need for a common European framework for languages to improve the recognition of language qualifications and help teachers co-operate. A project followed to develop language-level classifications for certification to be recognised across Europe.

As a result of the symposium, the Swiss National Science Foundation set up a project to develop levels of proficiency, to lead on to the creation of a "European Language Portfolio"certification in language ability which can be used across Europe.

A preliminary version of the Manual for Relating Language Examinations to the Common European Framework of Reference for Languages (CEFR) was published in 2003. This draft version was piloted in a number of projects, which included linking a single test to the CEFR, linking suites of exams at different levels and national studies by exam boards and research institutes. Practitioners and academics shared their experiences at a colloquium in Cambridge in 2007 and the pilot case studies and findings were published in Studies in Language Testing (SiLT). The findings from the pilot projects then informed the Manual revision project from 2008 to 2009.

Theoretical background

The CEFR divides general competences in knowledge, skills, and existential competence with particular communicative competences in linguistic competence, sociolinguistic competence and pragmatic competence. This division does not exactly match previously well-known notions of communicative competence, but correspondences among them can be made.

The CEFR has three principal dimensions: language activities, the domains in which the language activities occur, and the competencies on which a person draws when they engage in them.

Language activities 
The CEFR distinguishes four kinds of language activities: reception (listening and reading), production (spoken and written), interaction (spoken and written) and mediation (translating and interpreting).

Domains 
General and particular communicative competencies are developed by producing or receiving texts in various contexts under various conditions and constraints. These contexts correspond to various sectors of social life that the CEFR calls domains. Four broad domains are distinguished: educational, occupational, public and personal. These largely correspond to register.

Competences 
A language user can develop various degrees of competence in each of these domains and to help describe them, the CEFR has provided a set of six Common Reference Levels (A1, A2, B1, B2, C1, C2).

Common reference levels
The Common European Framework divides learners into three broad divisions that can each be further divided into two levels; for each level, it describes what a learner is supposed to be able to do in reading, listening, speaking and writing. The following table indicates these levels. A more thorough description of each level, with criteria for listening, reading, speaking and writing, is available on the Internet.

These descriptors can apply to any of the languages spoken in Europe and there are translations in many languages.

Relationship with duration of learning process
Educational bodies for various languages have offered estimates for the amount of study needed to reach levels in the relevant language.

Certification and teaching ecosystem enabled by the CEFR
Multiple organisations have been created to serve as an umbrella for language schools and certification businesses that claim compatibility with the CEFR. For example, the European Association for Language Testing and Assessment (EALTA) is an initiative funded by the European Community to promote the CEFR and best practices in delivering professional language training. The Association of Language Testers in Europe (ALTE) is a consortium of academic organisations that aims at standardising assessment methods. Eaquals (Evaluation and Accreditation of Quality in Language Services) is an international association of institutions and organisations involved in language education, active throughout Europe and following the CEFR.

In France, the Ministry for Education has created a government-mandated certificate called CLES, which formalises the use of the CEFR in language teaching programmes in French higher education institutions.

In Germany, Telc, a non-profit agency, is the federal government's exclusive partner for language tests taken at the end of the integration courses for migrants, following the CEFR standards.

Comparisons between CEFR and other scales

General scales

Studies have addressed correspondence with the ACTFL Proficiency Guidelines and the United States ILR scale.

For convenience, the following abbreviations will be used for the ACTFL levels:
 NL/NM/NH – Novice Low/Mid/High
 IL/IM/IH – Intermediate Low/Mid/High
 AL/AM/AH – Advanced Low/Mid/High
 S – Superior
 D – Distinguished (a name sometimes used for levels 4 and 4+ of the ILR scale instead of including them within Superior)

The following table summarises various proposed equivalences between CEFR and ACTFL:

In a panel discussion at the Osaka University of Foreign Studies, one of the coauthors of the CEFR, Brian North, stated that a "sensible hypothesis" would be for C2 to correspond to "Distinguished," C1 to "Superior," B2 to "Advanced-mid" and B1 to "Intermediate-high" in the ACTFL system.

This agrees with a table published by the American University Center of Provence giving the following correspondences:

However, a comparison between the ILR self-assessment grids (reading, speaking, listening) and the CEFR assessment grid could suggest a different equivalence:

A study by Buck, Papageorgiou and Platzek addresses the correspondence between the difficulty of test items under the CEFR and ILR standards. The most common ILR levels for items of given CEFR difficulty were as follows:
 Reading—A1: 1, A2: 1, B1: 1+, B2: 2+, C1: 3
 Listening—A1: 0+/1, A2: 1, B1: 1+, B2: 2, C1: 2+ (at least)

Canada increasingly uses the CEFR in a few domains. CEFR-compatible exams such as the DELF/DALF (French) and the DELE (Spanish) are administered. Universities increasingly structure their courses around the CEFR levels. Larry Vandergrift of the University of Ottawa has proposed Canadian adoption of the CEFR in his report Proposal for a Common Framework of Reference for Languages for Canada published by Heritage Canada. This report contains a comparison of the CEFR to other standards in use in Canada and proposes an equivalence table.

The resulting correspondence between the ILR and ACTFL scales disagrees with the generally accepted one. The ACTFL standards were developed so that Novice, Intermediate, Advanced and Superior would correspond to 0/0+, 1/1+, 2/2+ and 3/3+, respectively on the ILR scale. Also, the ILR and NB OPS scales do not correspond despite the fact that the latter was modelled on the former.

A more recent document by Macdonald and Vandergrift estimates the following correspondences (for oral ability) between the Public Service Commission levels and the CEFR levels:

Language schools may also propose their own equivalence tables. For example, the Vancouver English Centre provides a comprehensive equivalence table between the various forms of the TOEFL test, the Cambridge exam, the VEC level system, and the CEFR.

Language-specific scales

Difficulty in aligning the CEFR with teaching programmes
Language schools and certificate bodies evaluate their own equivalences against the framework. Differences of estimation have been found to exist, for example, with the same level on the PTE A, TOEFL, and IELTS, and is a cause of debate between test producers.

Non-Western areas and languages
The CEFR, initially developed to ease human mobility and economic growth within the highly multilingual European Union, has since influenced and been borrowed by various other areas.

Non-Western learners 
In Japan, the adoption of CEFR has been encouraged by academics, institutional actors (MEXT), politicians, business associations, and by learners themselves. Adoption in Malaysia has also been documented. In Vietnam, adoption of the CEFR has been connected to recent changes in English language policy, efforts to reform higher education, orientation toward economic opportunities and a tendency for administrators to look outwards for domestic solutions.

Noriyuki (2009) observes the "mechanical" reuse of the European framework and concepts by Japanese teachers of mostly Western languages, missing the recontextualisation part: the need to adapt the conceptual vocabulary to the local language and to adapt the framework to the local public, its language and practices.

Around 2005, the Osaka University of Foreign Studies developed a CEFR-inspired project for its 25 foreign languages, with a transparent and common evaluation approach. While major languages had long had well-defined tools for the Japanese public, able to guide teachers in teaching and performing assessments in a methodic way, this project pushed the adoption of similar practices to smaller languages, as requested by students.

In late 2006–2010, the Keio University led the ambitious CEFR-inspired Action Oriented Plurilingual Language Learning Project to favour multi-campus and inter-language cooperation in creating teaching materials and assessment systems from child to university levels. Since 2015, the "Research on Plurilinguistic and Pluricultural Skill Development in Integrated Foreign Language Education" has followed up.

Non-European languages 
The framework was translated into Chinese in 2008. In 2011, French sinologist Joël Bellassen suggests the CEFR together with its metalanguage could and should be adapted to distant languages such as Chinese, with the necessity to adapt and extend it with relevant concepts proper to the new language and its learners. Various efforts on adaptation to Chinese have been made.

In Japan, East-Asian language teaching is largely ignored due to Japanese society being mainly oriented toward Western language teaching, missing a valuable opportunity for Japanese to directly reach neighbouring countries and for smaller languages to solidify their languages' teaching.

Computer languages 
The CEFR methodology has been extended to describe and evaluate the proficiency of users of programming languages, when the programming activity is considered as a language activity.

See also
 Assessment of Basic Language and Learning Skills
 European Day of Languages (26 September)
 ILR or Foreign Service Level language ability measures
 List of language proficiency tests
 Studies in Language Testing (SiLT)
 Task-based language learning

References

Works cited

External links

Council of Europe
Language assessment